The 2014–15 IIHF European Women's Champions Cup was the eleventh competition held for the IIHF European Women's Champions Cup. It was the last holding of the tournament before its scheduled stoppage in 2015. SKIF Nizhny Novgorod of Russia's Women's Hockey League won the tournament for the second time; the team had previously won the cup in 2009.

The tournament was the setting for the first instance of the “four-man officiating system” - two referees and two linesmen - at an IIHF women’s hockey tournament. The first puck-drop with four officials occurred in the Round 2 game between the Vienna Capitals and HC Poprad in Nizhny Novgorod with referees Kaisa Ketonen (FIN) and Marie Picavet (FRA), and linesmen Yekaterina Mikhalyova (KAZ) and Olga Steinberg (RUS).

Round 1 
The first round was played during 17–19 October 2014. The winners of each group and the three best runners up out of all of the groups moved on to the next round.

Group A
Host City: Ankara, Turkey

Standings

Top scorers

Janka Čulíková (SVK), ŽHK Poprad, 10 points (7+3)
Karina Felzink (KAZ), Aisulu Almaty, 7 points (6+1)
Zarina Tukhtieva (KAZ), Aisulu Almaty, 6 points (4+2)
Anna Džurňáková (SVK), ŽHK Poprad, 5 points (3+2)Nadezhda Filimonova (KAZ), Aisulu Almaty, 5 points (3+2)

Best Players Selected by the Directorate
Best Goaltender: Tanay Gunay (TUR), Milenyum Ankara
Best Defenceman: Rayna Cruickshank (KAZ), Aisulu Almaty
Best Forward: Janka Čulíková (SVK), ŽHK Poprad

Group B
Host City: Karviná, Czech Republic

Standings

Top scorers

 Anna Meixner (AUT), EHV Sabres Vienna, 10 points (6+4)
 Karolina Późniewska (POL), TH Unia Oświęcim, 10 points (5+5)
Pia Pren (SLO), EHV Sabres Vienna, 9 points (4+5)
Kaitlin Spurling (USA), EHV Sabres Vienna, 8 points (4+4)
Venla Hovi (FIN), EHV Sabres Vienna, 6 points (3+3)

Best Players Selected by the Directorate
Best Goaltender: Victoria Vigilanti (CAN), EHV Sabres Vienna
Best Defenceman: Regan Boulton (CAN), EHV Sabres Vienna
Best Forward: Anna Meixner (AUT), EHV Sabres Vienna

Group C 
Host City: Liepāja, Latvia

Standings

Top scorers

Maria Olausson (DEN), Herlev Hornets, 11 points (6+5)
Silke Glud (DEN), Herlev Hornets, 8 points (5+3)
Marie Henriksen (DEN), Herlev Hornets, 7 points (3+4)
Agnese Apsīte (LAT), SHK Laima Rīga, 5 points (4+1)
Christina Andersen (DEN), Herlev Hornets, 5 points (1+4)

Group D
Host City: Bolzano, Italy

Standings

Top scorers

Chelsea Furlani (ITA/USA), EV Bozen Eagles, 12 points (7+5)
Anna de la Forest (ITA), EV Bozen Eagles, 12 points (2+10)
Eleonora Dalprà (ITA), EV Bozen Eagles, 11 points (4+7)
Cindy Debuquet (FRA), HC Neuilly-sur-Marne, 8 points (4+4)
Lili Pintér (HUN), UTE Marilyn Budapest, 6 points (3+3)

Round 2
The second round was played during 5–7 December 2014. The winner of each group progressed to the finals.

Group E
Host City: Nizhny Novgorod, Russia

Standings

Top scorers

Olga Sosina (RUS), SKIF Nizhny Novgorod, 6 points (1+5)
Pia Pren (SLO), EHV Sabres Vienna, 5 points (4+1)
Maria Pechnikova (RUS), SKIF Nizhny Novgorod, 5 points (2+3)
Aneta Ledlova (CZE), SK Karviná, 4 points (2+2)
Anna Meixner (AUT), EHV Sabres Vienna, 3 points (3+0)

Best Players Selected by the Directorate

Best Goaltender: Meeri Räisänen (FIN), SKIF Nizhny Novgorod
Best Defenceman: Regan Boulton (CAN), EHV Sabres Vienna
Best Forward: Karoliina Rantamäki (FIN), SKIF Nizhny Novgorod

Group F
Host City: Lugano, Switzerland

Standings

Top scorers

Bettina Meyer (CHE), HC Lugano, 7 points (3+4)
Silke Glud (DEN), HC Lugano, 6 points (3+3)
Sophie Kratzer (GER), ESC Planegg, 6 points (2+4)
Evelina Raselli (CHE), HC Lugano, 5 points (4+1)Kerstin Spielberger (GER), ESC Planegg, 5 points (4+1)
Nicole Gifford (CAN), HC Lugano, 5 points (3+2)

Group G
Host City: Linköping, Sweden

Standings

Top scorers

Denise Altmann (AUT), Linköpings HC, 8 points (4+4)
Michelle Karvinen (FIN), Espoo Blues, 7 points (5+2)
Pernilla Winberg (SWE), Linköpings HC, 6 points (2+4)
Minttu Tuominen (FIN), Espoo Blues, 4 points (4+0)
Stefanie Marty (CHE), Linköpings HC, 4 points (2+2)Emilia Andersson (SWE), Linköpings HC, 4 points (2+2)Tatyana Koroleva (KAZ), Aisulu Almaty, 4 points (2+2)

Finals

The tournament finals (Group H) were held during 20–22 February 2015. The round was hosted in Espoo, Finland and all games were played at the Espoonlahti Ice Rink.

Standings

Results

Top scorers 

Stefanie Marty (CHE), Linköpings HC, 8 points (1+7)
Denise Altmann (AUT), Linköpings HC, 7 points (4+3)
Olga Sosina (RUS), SKIF Nizhny Novgorod, 6 points (2+4)
Karoliina Rantamäki (FIN), SKIF Nizhny Novgorod, 5 points (3+2)Pernilla Winberg (CHE), Linköpings HC, 5 points (3+2)
Michelle Karvinen (FIN), Espoo Blues, 5 points (2+3)

Best Players Selected by the Directorate

References 

Tournament statistics and data from:

 "IIHF European Women Champions Cup: Tournament Reports". webarchive.iihf.com. International Ice Hockey Federation. Retrieved 2019-11-19.
 "Coupe d'Europe de hockey sur glace féminin 2014/15". hockeyarchives.info (in French). Retrieved 2019-09-04.
 "IIHF European Women's Champions Cup 2014/2015 - Summary of the competition". the-sports.org. Retrieved 2019-09-03.

External links
 2014–15 EWCC Tournament Reports at the IIHF Webarchives

2014-15
Women
Euro